During both world wars, women were required to undertake new roles by their respective national war efforts. Women across the world experienced severe setbacks as well as considerable societal progress during this timeframe. The two World Wars hinged as much on industrial production as they did on battlefield clashes.  With millions of men away fighting and with the inevitable casualties, there was a severe shortage of labour in a range of industries, from rural and farm work to urban office jobs.  While some women managed to enter the traditionally male career paths, women, for the most part, were expected to be primarily involved in "duties at home" and "women's work," especially after the wars were over.  On the other hand, the two wars also victimized women and subjected them to numerous incidences of sexual violence, abuse, and death.

During World War I, women in the Western World, including Europe, Canada, and the United States, contributed to the war efforts on both the home fronts and the battlefields. Women’s employment rates skyrocket in domestic and industrial sectors. Nursing became one of the most popular professions in military employment during these years. In Asia, women’s labor in the cotton and silk industries became essential for the economy.  Before 1914, only a few countries, including New Zealand, Australia, and several Scandinavian nations, had given women the right to vote (see Women's suffrage), but otherwise, women were minimally involved in the political process. Women’s participation in WWI fostered the support and development of the suffrage movement, including in the United States.

During the Second World War, women’s contributions to industrial labor in factories which were located on the home fronts kept society and the military running while the world was in chaos. Women in the Western World also gained more opportunities to serve directly in their country's armed forces, which they had limited opportunity to in WWI. At the same time, women faced a significant amount of abuse during this time; women across Asia were systematically raped by the Japanese military, and Jewish women were physically abused, raped, and murdered in Nazi concentration camps across Europe.

The participation of women in the World Wars catalyzed the later recruitment of women in many countries' armed forces. Women’s participation in these wartime efforts exposed their commitment to serving their country and preserving national security and identity.

World War I

Europe

In Great Britain just before World War I there were 24 million adult women and 1.7 million worked in domestic service, 200,000 worked in the textile manufacturing industry, 600,000 worked in the clothing trades, 500,000 worked in commerce, and 260,000 worked in local and national government, including teaching. The British textile and clothing trades, in particular, employed far more women than men and were regarded as 'women's work'.  By 1914 nearly. 5.09 million out of the 23.8 million women in Britain were working. Thousands worked in munitions factories (see Canary girl, Gretna Girls), offices and large hangars used to build aircraft. Women were also involved in knitting socks for the soldiers on the front, as well as other voluntary work, but as a matter of survival women had to work for paid employment for the sake of their families.  Many women worked as volunteers serving at the Red Cross, encouraged the sale of war bonds or planted "victory gardens". 

The First World War gave women in Great Britain the opportunity to participate in the workforce, including assembly lines. In Great Britain, this was known as a process of "Dilution" and was strongly contested by the trade unions, particularly in the engineering and ship building industries. For the duration of both World Wars, women sometimes did take on skilled "men's work". However, in accordance with the agreement negotiated with the trade unions, women undertaking jobs covered by the Dilution agreement lost their jobs at the end of the First World War.

Although women were still paid less than men in the workforce, pay inequalities were starting to diminish as women were now getting paid two-thirds of the typical pay for men, a 28% increase. However, the extent of this change is open to historical debate. In part because of female participation in the war effort Canada, the United States, Great Britain, and a number of European countries extended suffrage to women in the years after the First World War.

British historians  no longer emphasize the granting of woman suffrage as a reward for women's participation in war work. Historian Martin D. Pugh, argues that women’s suffrage was primarily determined by senior politicians. The suffragettes had been weakened, Pugh argues, by repeated failures before 1914 and by the disorganizing effects of war mobilization; therefore they quietly accepted these age-related restrictions, which were approved in 1918 by a majority of the War Ministry and each political party in Parliament. More generally, G. R. Searle (2004) argues that the British debate was essentially over by the 1890s, and that granting the suffrage in 1918 was mostly a byproduct of giving the vote to male soldiers. Women in Britain finally achieved suffrage on the same terms as men in 1928.

Nursing became almost the only area of female contribution that involved being at the front and experiencing the war. In Britain the Queen Alexandra's Royal Army Nursing Corps, First Aid Nursing Yeomanry and Voluntary Aid Detachment were all started before World War I.  The VADs were not allowed in the front line until 1915.

In other European countries, such as in the 1918 Finnish Civil War, more than 2,000 women fought in the paramilitary Women's Red Guards. The only belligerent to deploy female combat troops in substantial numbers was the Russian Provisional Government in 1917.  Its few "Women's Battalions" fought well, but failed to provide the propaganda value expected of them and were disbanded before the end of the year.  In the later Russian Civil War, the Bolsheviks would also employ women infantry.

Women living in present-day Slovakia, which at the time of the First World War was under the rule of the Habsburg monarchy, did not always uphold the pro-war attitude that dominated throughout central Europe. Furthermore, their dissenting attitudes towards war heightened especially when members of their own families, such as their husbands, were conscripted into the army. Women expressed their disapproval by creating feminist organizations such as the Hungarian Feminist’s Association to encourage pacifism. Habsburg monarchy women also expressed their disapproval through public protestation.

Asia 
Thousands of migrants came from Asia to Europe during WWI in order to assist with the war efforts in Great Britain, with approximately 92,000 war workers coming from China alone. European powers relied on a male labor force in winning the war, thus leaving families divided at home.

In the years leading up to the First World War, the cotton and silk industries grew exponentially in Japan. More than 80% of Japanese female citizens worked in these textile industries during and nearing the end of WWI. Their working conditions were poor, as the female employees were subjected to malnutrition and serious illnesses such as tuberculosis while living together in unsanitary dormitories.

Canada 
Over 2,800 women served with the Royal Canadian Army Medical Corps during the First World War and it was during that era that the role of Canadian women in the military first extended beyond nursing. Women were given paramilitary training in small arms, drill, first aid and vehicle maintenance in case they were needed as home guards. Forty-three women in the Canadian military died during WWI.

The United States 
Women became members of the social-welfare program entitled the American Red Cross. Women worked locally within their state by aiding traveling soldiers and raising money to support the war efforts. Furthermore, women serving for the America Red Cross also had the opportunity to serve in Europe, where the war was mostly taking place. Abroad, these women worked as nurses, recreational volunteers, chemists, and more.

Additionally, more than 12,000 women enlisted in auxiliary roles in the United States Navy and Marine Corps during the First World War. About 400 of them died in that war.

World War II

The United States
During WWII, in total, 6 million women were added to the workforce in what resulted as a major cultural shift. With the men fighting in the wars, women were needed to take on responsibilities that the men had to leave behind.

Women in World War II took on a variety of roles, from country to country. World War II involved global conflict on an unprecedented scale; the absolute urgency of mobilizing the entire population made the expansion of the role of women inevitable. Rosie the Riveter became an emblem of women’s dedication to the traditionally male labor during this time.

With this expanded horizon of opportunity and confidence, and with the extended skill base that many women could now give to paid and voluntary employment, women's roles in World War II were even more extensive than in the First World War.  By 1945, more than 2.2 million women were working in war industries, especially in munitions plants.  They participated in the building of ships, aircraft, vehicles, and weaponry.  Women also worked on farms, drove trucks, provided logistic support for soldiers and entered professional areas of work that were previously the preserve of men.  In the Allied countries thousands of women enlisted as nurses serving in the front line units. According to historian D’Ann Campbell, “Between 1942 and 1945 140,000 women served in the WACs, 100,000 in the WAVES, 23,000 in the Marines, 13,000 in the SPARS, and 74,000 in the Army and Navy Nurse Corps”. Women became officially recognized as a permanent part of the U.S. armed forces after the war with the passing of the Women's Armed Services Integration Act of 1948.

The ability for women to be involved overseas opened doors for many underrepresented groups, including Latinas, to serve their country. Out of one million African Americans serving in WWII, 600,000 of them were women.  4,000 of these women served in the Women's Army Corps and 330 of these women served as nurses.  African American women also fought for African American rights through media, social activism, etc.  A person's race was heavily divided and in the year 1943, there were a documented 242 violent events against African Americans regardless of whether they served in the war efforts or not.

Additionally, the Second World War expanded labor employment opportunities for black women across the United States. Specifically, industrial labor became more common among black females, as black female employment in the industrial sector increased by 11.5% during this time. Nearing the end of the war, black females working in industrial occupations were the first to be fired from their jobs; as a result, they then turned to occupations such as being maids or laundry pressers.

Europe
Several hundred thousand women in European countries served in combat roles, especially in anti-aircraft units. Many women served in the resistances of Yugoslavia, Poland, France, and Italy, and in the British SOE and American OSS which aided these. 

Germany had presented an ideal female role at home, but the urgent need for war production led to the hiring of millions of German women for factory and office work. Even so, the Nazi regime declared the role of women in German society to strictly fall along the lines of motherhood. Yet, the role of motherhood was only offered to white, German blooded women because the Nazi regime promoted the sterilization of women for “reasons of racial hygiene”.

Jewish women were encouraged to obtain an abortion in order to limit the increase of Jewish genetics, and a series of mass sterilizations occurred in Nazi concentration camps. Beyond mass sterilizations, women in concentration camps across Europe in the Second World War experienced sexual violence and abuse by many SS guards, though the notion that the camps fostered a systematic rape of its prisoners has not been affirmed by scholars. While other women were able to obtain jobs and new opportunities in other parts of the world during this time period, it is important to note that this was not the case for a majority of Jewish and even Gypsy women in Europe.

Millions of Jewish women in the Holocaust were killed, and the Nazis also killed other women who belonged to groups they were committing genocide against, such as women with disabilities and Roma women.

Asia 
A large number of women in Japan and Korea also performed industrial labor duties during the war. They helped make bombs and guns and airplanes, etc.

Women, called comfort women, were forced into sexual slavery by the Imperial Japanese Army before and during World War II. In other words, the Comfort Women were a part of a systematic rape used by Japan, especially among the armed forces in the Second World War. Korean women were especially used. The Japanese Imperial Army based these women within “Comfort Stations” near the battlefields in order to have sex with them. Aging from eleven to twenty years old, the Comfort Women were kidnapped from their homes in order to serve the Japanese army. In recent years, political elites in Japanese society have denied the systematic rape of the Comfort Women during the World War II period, including former Japanese Prime Minister Abe. Despite recent controversy over this topic in Japanese politics and education, numerous researchers have proven that Japanese Comfort Women were subjected to sexual slavery and should be recognized for their unjust treatment.

Australia 

Australian women during World War II played a larger role than they had during The First World War, when they primarily served as nurses and additional homefront workers. Many women wanted to play an active role in the war, and hundreds of voluntary women's auxiliary and paramilitary organisations had been formed by 1940. A shortage of male recruits forced the military to establish female branches in 1941 and 1942. Women entered roles which had traditionally been limited to men, but continued to receive lower wages.

Canada

Canadian women in the World Wars became indispensable because the World Wars were total wars that required the maximum effort of the civilian population. While Canadians were deeply divided on the issue of conscription for men, there was wide agreement that women had important new roles to play in the home, in civic life, in industry, in nursing, and even in military uniforms. Historians debate whether there was much long-term impact on the postwar roles of women.

See also
Air Transport Auxiliary (UK)
Australian Women's Army Service (World War II)
Australian Women's Land Army
Canadian Women's Army Corps – known as "CWACs"
Dorothy Lawrence – British reporter who posed as a man in the First World War
Female guards in Nazi concentration camps
First Aid Nursing Yeomanry (UK) – known as "FANYs"
Himeyuri Students
Women in the military#History
List of uprisings led by women
Ochotnicza Legia Kobiet (Poland, 1918), and the later Przysposobienie Wojskowe Kobiet (1920s-1930s)
Soviet women in World War II
SPARS (U.S. Navy)
White feather
Wojskowa Służba Kobiet of the Polish resistance, the Home Army
Women Accepted for Volunteer Emergency Service (USA) – known as "WAVES"
Women Airforce Service Pilots (USA) – known as "WASPs"
Women in the Russian and Soviet military
Women's Army Corps (USA) – known as "WACs"
Women's Auxiliary Air Force (UK)
Women's Auxiliary Service (Poland) – its members known as "Pestki" (after PSK, Pomocnicza Służba Kobiet)
Women's Auxiliary Territorial Service (UK) (in which Princess Elizabeth, now Queen Elizabeth II, was enlisted)
Women's Land Army (UK) – known as "Land girls"
Woman's Land Army of America
Women's Royal Army Corps (UK)
Women's Royal Australian Naval Service (Australia) – known as "WRANS"
Women's Royal Canadian Naval Service (Canada) – also known as "Wrens"
Women's Royal Naval Service (UK) – known as "Wrens"

References

Further reading

Women on the homefront 
 Beauman, Katharine Bentley. Green Sleeves: The Story of WVS/WRVS (London: Seeley, Service & Co. Ltd., 1977)
 Calder, Angus. The People's War: Britain 1939-45 (1969)
 Campbell, D'Ann. Women at War With America: Private Lives in a Patriotic Era (1984)
 Cook, Bernard A.  Women and war: a historical encyclopedia from antiquity to the present (2006)
 Costello, John. Love, Sex, and War: Changing Values, 1939-1945 (1985). US title: Virtue under Fire: How World War II Changed Our Social and Sexual Attitudes
 Darian-Smith, Kate. On the Home Front: Melbourne in Wartime, 1939-1945. Australia: Oxford UP, 1990.
 Falconi, April M., et al. "Shifts in women's paid employment participation during the World War II era and later life health." Journal of Adolescent Health 66.1 (2020): S42-S50 online.
 Gildea, Robert. Marianne in Chains: Daily Life in the Heart of France During the German Occupation (2004)
 Maurine W. Greenwald. Women, War, and Work: The Impact of World War I on Women Workers in the United States (1990)
 Hagemann, Karen and Stefanie Schüler-Springorum; Home/Front: The Military, War, and Gender in Twentieth-Century Germany. Berg, 2002.
 Harris, Carol (2000). Women at War 1939-1945: The Home Front. Stroud: Sutton Publishing Limited. .
 Havens, Thomas R. "Women and War in Japan, 1937-1945." American Historical Review 80 (1975): 913-934. online in JSTOR.
 Higonnet, Margaret R., et al., eds. Behind the Lines: Gender and the Two World Wars. Yale UP, 1987.
 Marwick, Arthur. War and Social Change in the Twentieth Century: A Comparative Study of Britain, France, Germany, Russia, and the United States. 1974.
 Noakes, J. (ed.), The Civilian in War: The Home Front in Europe, Japan and the U.S.A. in World War II. Exeter: Exęter University Press. 1992.
 Pierson, Ruth Roach. They're Still Women After All: The Second World War and Canadian Womanhood. Toronto: McClelland and Stewart, 1986.
 Regis, Margaret. When Our Mothers Went to War: An Illustrated History of Women in World War II. Seattle: NavPublishing. (2008) .
 Wightman, Clare (1999). More than Munitions: Women, Work and the Engineering Industries 1900-1950. London: Addison Wesley Longman limited. .
 Williams, Mari. A. (2002). A Forgotten Army: Female Munitions Workers of South Wales, 1939-1945. Cardiff: University of Wales Press. .
 
 "Government Girls of World War II" 2004 film by Leslie Sewell

Women in military service
 Bidwell, Shelford. The Women's Royal Army Corps (London, 1977),
 Campbell, D'Ann. "Women in Combat: The World War Two Experience in the United States, Great Britain, Germany, and the Soviet Union" Journal of Military History (April 1993), 57:301-323. online edition
 Campbell, D'Ann.  "The women of World War II." in A Companion to World War II ed. by Thomas W. Zeiler(2013) 2:717–738. online
 Campbell, D'Ann. Women at War With America: Private Lives in a Patriotic Era (1984) ch 1-2
 Campbell, D'Ann. "Women in Uniform: The World War II Experiment,"  Military Affairs, Vol. 51, No. 3, Fiftieth Year—1937-1987 (July, 1987), pp. 137–139  in JSTOR
  Cottam, K. Jean, ed. The Golden-Tressed Soldier (Manhattan, KS, Military Affairs/Aerospace Historian Publishing, 1983) on Soviet women
  Cottam, K. Jean. Soviet Airwomen in Combat in World War II (Manhattan, KS: Military Affairs/Aerospace Historian Publishing, 1983)
  Cottam, K. Jean. "Soviet Women in Combat in World War II: The Ground Forces and the Navy," International Journal of Women's Studies, 3, no. 4 (1980): 345-57
 DeGroot G.J. "Whose Finger on the Trigger? Mixed Anti-Aircraft Batteries and the Female Combat Taboo," War in History, Volume 4, Number 4, December 1997, pp. 434–453(20)
 Dombrowski, Nicole Ann. Women and War in the Twentieth Century: Enlisted With Or Without Consent (1999)
 Grant, Susan-Mary. "On the Field of Mercy: Women Medical Volunteers from the Civil War to the First World War." American Nineteenth Century History (2012) 13#2 pp: 276-278. 
 Hacker, Barton C. and Margaret Vining, eds. A Companion to Women's Military History  (2012) 625pp; articles by scholars covering a very wide range of topics
 Hagemann, Karen, "Mobilizing Women for War: The History, Historiography, and Memory of German Women’s War Service in the Two World Wars," Journal of Military History 75:3 (2011): 1055-1093
 Krylova, Anna. Soviet Women in Combat: A History of Violence on the Eastern Front (2010) excerpt and text search
 Leneman, Leah. "Medical women at war, 1914–1918." Medical history (1994) 38#2 pp: 160-177. online on Britain
 Merry, L. K. Women Military Pilots of World War II: A History with Biographies of American, British, Russian and German Aviators (McFarland, 2010).
 Pennington, Reina. Wings, Women, and War: Soviet Airwomen in World War II Combat  (2007)  excerpt and text search 
 Pennington, Reina. Amazons to Fighter Pilots: A Biographical Dictionary of Military Women (Greenwood, 2003).
 Saywell, Shelley. Women in War (Toronto, 1985);
 Seidler, Franz W. Frauen zu den Waffen—Marketenderinnen, Helferinnen Soldatinnen ["Women to Arms: Sutlers, Volunteers, Female Soldiers"] (Koblenz, Bonn: Wehr & Wissen, 1978)
 Stoff, Laurie S.  They Fought for the Motherland: Russia's Women Soldiers in World War I And the Revolution (2006)
 Treadwell, Mattie. The Women's Army Corps (1954)
 Tuten, "Jeff M. Germany and the World Wars," in Nancy Loring Goldman, ed. Female Combatants or Non-Combatants? (1982)

External links 

 Grayzel, Susan R.: Women’s Mobilization for War , in: 1914-1918-online. International Encyclopedia of the First World War.
Women of World War I The Women of World War I (from the book "War and Gender").
Railwaywomen in Wartime British women's work on the railways in both world wars - photos and text - free information.
WWII US women's service organizations — History and uniforms in color (WAAC/WAC, WAVES, ANC, NNC, USMCWR, PHS, SPARS, ARC and WASP)
The U.S. Army Nurse Corps a publication of the United States Army Center of Military History
 Women soldiers in Polish Home Army
Women in World War II Fact Sheet  Statistics on the many roles of American women in World War II